The Jeep Avenger is a subcompact crossover SUV (B-segment) to be produced by Jeep in 2023 mainly for the European market. Positioned below the Renegade, it will be the smallest vehicle offered by Jeep.

Overview
The Avenger was presented on 8 September 2022 and at the 2022 Paris Motor Show in October. It will be offered with mild hybrid and battery electric models. It use the STLA Small platform, a development from the CMP platform (eCMP for the electric model) originally developed by the PSA Group, and shared with the Peugeot 2008, Opel Mokka and DS 3 Crossback.

The Avenger offers a  ground clearance, 20 degrees of approach angle, and 32 degrees of departure angle. It is also equipped with Jeep's "Selec-Terrain" drive mode (with Normal, Eco, Sport, Snow, Mud, and Sand modes) and Hill Descent Control.

Designed in Italy and manufactured in Poland, the Avenger will be primarily marketed in Europe, with sales in Japan and South Korea also planned. It will not be available in the United States, Canada, and China. Deliveries to customers will start in 2023, with Jeep targeting annual production of 110,000 units.

The "Avenger" nameplate has previously been used by Chrysler on two previous occasions, namely the Dodge Avenger (a North American product) on sale from 1994-2000, then 2008-2014; and before that on the Hillman Avenger (built by Chrysler's long defunct European division) in the 1970s.

Avenger EV
The battery electric version will be available before the petrol-powered model.

Avenger 4xe

The four-wheel-drive version of the Avenger was preceded by the Jeep Avenger 4xe concept car, presented at the 2022 Paris Motor Show in October.

References

External links

 Official website

Avenger
Cars introduced in 2022
Mini sport utility vehicles
Crossover sport utility vehicles
Front-wheel-drive vehicles
All-wheel-drive vehicles
Production electric cars